Falls in older adults are a significant cause of morbidity and mortality and are a major class of preventable injuries. Falling is one of the most common accidents that cause a loss in the quality of life for older adults, and is usually precipitated by a loss of balance and weakness in the legs. The cause of falling in old age is often multifactorial and may require a multidisciplinary approach both to treat any injuries sustained and to prevent future falls. Falls include dropping from a standing position or from exposed positions such as those on ladders or stepladders. The severity of injury is generally related to the height of the fall. The state of the ground surface onto which the victim falls is also important, harder surfaces causing more severe injury. Falls can be prevented by ensuring that carpets are tacked down, that objects like electric cords are not in one's path, that hearing and vision are optimized, dizziness is minimized, alcohol intake is moderated and that shoes have low heels or rubber soles.

A review of clinical trial evidence by the European Food Safety Authority led to a recommendation that people over age 60 years should supplement the diet with vitamin D to reduce the risk of falling and bone fractures. Falls are an important aspect of geriatric medicine.

Definition
Other definitions are more inclusive and do not exclude "major intrinsic events" as a fall. Falls are of concern within medical treatment facilities. Fall prevention is usually a priority in healthcare settings.

A 2006 review of literature identified the need for standardization of falls taxonomy due to the variation within research. The Prevention of Falls Network Europe (ProFane) taxonomy for the definition and reporting of falls aimed at mitigating this problem. ProFane recommended that a fall  be defined as "an unexpected event in which the participants come to rest on the ground, floor, or lower level." The ProFane taxonomy is currently used as a framework to appraise falls-related research studies in Cochrane Systematic Reviews.

Signs and symptoms
Trauma
Soft tissue injuries. Bilateral orbital haematomas (two black eyes) suggests that the faller was probably not conscious as they fell, as they did not manage to protect their face as they hit the ground.
Fractures and dislocations. 5% of fallers end up having a fracture as a result of their fall, and 1% fracture their neck of femur.
Disuse atrophy and muscle wasting from reduced physical activity during recovery periods
Due to bed rest
Pneumonia
Pressure sores
Dehydration
Hypothermia
A fear of falling

Causes
Falls are often caused by a number of factors. The faller may live with many risk factors for falling and only have problems when another factor appears. As such, management is often tailored to treating the factor that caused the fall, rather than all of the risk factors a patient has for falling.
Risk factors may be grouped into intrinsic factors, such as existence of a specific ailment or disease. External or extrinsic factors include the environment and the way in which it may encourage or deter accidental falls. Such factors as lighting and illumination, personal aid equipment and floor traction are all important in fall prevention.

Intrinsic factors
Balance and gait
As a result of stroke disease, Parkinsonism, arthritic changes, neuropathy, neuromuscular disease or vestibular disease.
Visual motor reaction time problems
An extended reaction time will delay responses and compensations to standing or walking imbalances, thus increasing the likelihood of falls.
Medications
Polypharmacy is common in older people
Sedatives significantly increase the risk of falling
Cardiovascular medications can contribute towards falls
Visual impairment
Visual impairments, glaucoma, macular degeneration and retinopathy increase the risk of falling and of hip fractures.
Bifocals and trifocals can increase the risk of falling as the lower portion of corrective lenses are optimized for distances approximately 18inches, thus precluding clear vision of one's feet/floor, approximately 4.5 to 5.5 feet below one's eyes.
Cognitive problems
Dementia increases the likelihood of falls
Cardiovascular causes
Orthostatic hypotension
Postprandial hypotension
Carotid sinus syndrome
Neurocardiogenic syncope– the commonest cause of syncope in A&E patients
Cardiac arrhythmias
Structural heart disease, such as valvular heart disease

Extrinsic factors

Poor lighting due to low luminance of existing lights or lamps, so preventing hazard identification and avoidance. Eyesight deteriorates with age, and extra lighting will be needed where seniors move frequently. The power of the bulbs used should be higher than normally accepted, with incandescent bulbs preferred [or LEDs?] especially as they react much more quickly than other types of bulb when switched on. This is vital when entering a room where an obstacle can trip the user for example, especially if not seen in time to prevent the accident.
Stairs with inadequate handrails, or too steep, encouraging trips and falls. The steps should be spaced widely with low risers, and surfaces should be slip-resistant. Softer surfaces can help limit impact injuries by cushioning loads.
Doorways with adequate headroom so that the user's head does not hit the lintel. Doorways of low headroom (less than about 2 metres) are common in old houses and cottages for example.
Rugs/floor surfaces with low friction, causing poor traction and individual instability. All surfaces should have a high friction coefficient with shoe soles.
Clothing/footwear poorly fitted, shoes of low friction against floor. Rubber soles with ribs normally have a high friction coefficient, so are preferred for most purposes. Clothing should fit the user well, without trailing parts (hems falling below the heel and loose shoe strings) which could snag with obstacles
Lack of equipment/aids such as walking sticks or walking frames, such as Zimmer frames so as to improve user stability. Grab bars and hanging straps should be supplied plentifully, especially in critical areas where users may be vulnerable.

Diagnosis
When assessing a person who has fallen an eyewitness account of the incident is helpful. The person who fell may have had some loss of consciousness and may not be able to give an accurate description of the fall. In practice, these eyewitness accounts are often unavailable. 30% of cognitively intact older people are unable to remember a documented fall three months later.
Important points of inquiry:
Visual motor reaction time
Frequency of falls
Effectiveness of "parachute" corrective response of moving hand and arm to "break" the fall
Eyewitness account
Associated features
Risk factors for falling
legal and illegal drug interactions
Sedative and alcohol consumption
Assessment of proper, safe use of cane or walker assistive device

Prevention

The relationship between the person at risk of falling and their environment is important for determining the risk falls and taking measures to prevent falls. An assessment with an occupational therapist may be helpful to determine an appropriate rehabilitation plan to prevent falls by taking into consideration both the person and their living environment. A large body of evidence shows that efforts to include exercise decrease the risk of falls, and yet the fear of falling can lead to a decrease in participation in physical exercise.

Possible interventions to prevent falls include:

Environmental adaptations 
Improvements to the person's environment such as their home or workplace may help to reduce the risk of falling.

A review of the current living conditions
Adding safety devices, such as grab handles, high friction floors, as well as low power lighting at night to the person's home or work environment
Identify and remove potential hazards

Behavioural interventions 
Regular exercise - lower limb strengthening exercise to increase muscle strength. Other forms of exercise, such as those involving gait, balance, co-ordination and functional tasks, may also help improve balance in older adults.
A 2014 review concluded that exercise interventions may reduce fear of falling (FOF) in community-dwelling older adults immediately after the intervention, without evidence of long-term effects.
Monitoring of medications and ongoing medical problems - For example, people with polymyalgia rheumatica often take long-term steroids, leading to osteoporosis. Research in the UK has also suggested that these people would benefit from a falls assessment when first diagnosed, and regular treatment reviews.
Improvements to footwear and utilization of orthotic devices if required.
Supplementation with vitamin D is not recommended in those without vitamin D deficiency for fall prevention in older adults.

Interventions to minimize the consequences of falls 
 Hip protectors may decrease risk of hip fractures slightly, although they may slightly increase the risk of a pelvic fracture in older adults living in nursing care facilities. Little or no effect reported on other fractures or falls.
Treatment for osteoporosis

Hospital
People who are hospitalized are at risk for falling. A randomized trial showed that use of a tool kit reduced falls in hospitals. Nurses complete a valid fall risk assessment scale. From that, a software package develops customized fall prevention interventions to address patients' specific determinants of fall risk. The kit also has bed posters with brief text and an accompanying icon, patient education handouts, and plans of care, all communicating patient-specific alerts to key stakeholders.

Screening 
American Geriatrics society (AGS)/British Geriatrics Society (BGS) recommend that all older adults should be screened for "falls in the past year".  Fall history is the strongest risk factor associated with subsequent falls. Older people who have experienced at least one fall in the last 6 months, or who believe that they may fall in the coming months, should be evaluated with the aim of reducing their risk of recurrent falls.

Many health institutions in USA have developed screening questionnaires. Enquiry includes difficulty with walking and balance, medication use to help with sleep/mood, loss of sensation in feet, vision problems, fear of falling, and use of assistive devices for walking.

Older adults who report falls should be asked about their circumstances and frequency to assess risks from gait and balance which may be compromised. A fall risk assessment is done by a clinician to include history, physical exam, functional capability, and environment.

Epidemiology
The incidence of falls increases progressively with age. According to the existing scientific literature, approximately one-third of the elderly population experiences one or more falls each year, while 10% experience multiple falls annually. The risk is greater in people older than 80 years, in which the annual incidence of falls can reach 50%.

History
Researchers have tried to create a consensual definition of a fall since the 1980s. Tinneti et al. defined a fall as "an event which results in a person coming to rest unintentionally on the ground or other lower level, not as a result of a major intrinsic event (such as a stroke) or overwhelming hazard."

Economics 
The health care impact and costs of falls in older adults are significantly rising all over the world. The cost of falls is categorized into 2 aspects: direct cost and indirect cost.

Direct costs are what patients and insurance companies pay for treating fall-related injuries. This includes fees for the hospital and nursing home, doctors and other professional services, rehabilitation, community-based services, use of medical equipment, prescription drugs, changes made to home and insurance processing.

Indirect costs include the loss of productivity of family caregivers and long-term effects of fall-related injuries such as disability, dependence on others and reduced quality of life.

In the United States alone, the total cost of falling injuries for people 65 and older was $31 billion in 2015. The costs covered millions of hospital emergency room visits for non-fatal injuries and more than 800,000 hospitalizations. By 2030, the annual number of falling injuries is expected to be 74 million older adults.

Research
Furthermore, a 2012 systematic review has demonstrated that performing dual-task tests (for example, combining a walking task with a counting task) may help in predicting which people are at an increased risk of a fall.

References

External links 

 Morse Fall Assessment An assessment tool to determine and quantify persons as low, mid, and high risk for falls.
 Older Adult Falls – Centers for Disease Control and Prevention

Geriatrics
Older adults
Causes of death
Injuries